Jito can refer to:

 Jito, the medieval land stewards in Japan
 Empress Jitō
 Mata Jito, the wife of Guru Gobind Singh
 Jito (footballer) (b. 1980), Spanish footballer, full name Juan José Silvestre Cantó